Renascença is a municipality in Brazil.

Renascença may also refer to:
Renascença, Santa Maria, a barrio in Brazil
Rádio Renascença of Portugal